Na Son is a commune (xã) and village of the Điện Biên Đông District of Điện Biên Province, northwestern Vietnam. The village is known as Ban Na Son. It is located just to the southwest of Điện Biên Đông town and just northeast of Keo Lôm. The commune covers an area of 73.59 square kilometres and has a reported population of 2954.

References

Communes of Điện Biên province
Populated places in Điện Biên province